Patricia Ward Hales (née Ward; 27 February 1929 – 22 June 1985) was a tennis player from the United Kingdom who reached the singles final of the 1955 U.S. Championships, losing to Doris Hart.

Hales partnered Shirley Bloomer to reach the women's doubles final at the 1955 Wimbledon Championships, where they lost to the team of Angela Mortimer and Anne Shilcock in two sets and at the French Championships, where they lost to the team of Darlene Hard and Beverly Baker Fleitz in three sets. She again reached the women's doubles final at the French Championships, where she and Ann Haydon lost to the team of Hard and Maria Bueno in straight sets.

With George Worthington, she reached the semifinals of the mixed doubles at Wimbledon in 1953. She won the singles title at the Italian Open in 1955, beating Erika Vollmer; she also won the doubles with Christiane Mercelis. Ward had been runner-up to Maureen Connolly in 1954. Also in 1955, she won Monte Carlo, beating Shirley Bloomer. She reached the semifinals at Wimbledon in 1956, beating Angela Mortimer in straight sets, then lost to Angela Buxton. She reached the final of the British Hard Court Championships in 1957, scoring victories over Darlene Hard and Ann Haydon on the way, then losing in three sets to Shirley Bloomer. At Wimbledon in 1958, she defeated the seeded Karol Fageros, then lost to Ann Haydon in three sets in the round of 16.

According to Lance Tingay of The Daily Telegraph and the Daily Mail, Hales was ranked in the world top 10 in 1955 and 1956, reaching a career high of world No. 8 in 1956.

Grand Slam finals

Singles (1 runner-up)

Doubles (3 runner-ups)

Grand Slam singles tournament timeline

See also 
 Performance timelines for all female tennis players who reached at least one Grand Slam final

References

1985 deaths
1929 births
English female tennis players
Tennis people from Greater London